Denis Kudla was the defending champion but chose not to compete.
Michael Russell defeated Peter Polansky in the singles final, 7–5, 2–6, 7–6(7–5).

Seeds

Draw

Finals

Top half

Bottom half

References
 Main Draw
 Qualifying Draw

Charlottesville Men's Pro Challenger - Singles
2013 Singles